The Penwith Society of Arts is an art group formed in St Ives, Cornwall, England, UK, in early 1949 by abstract artists who broke away from the more conservative St Ives School.  It was originally led by Barbara Hepworth and Ben Nicholson, and included members of the Crypt Group of the St Ives Society, including Peter Lanyon and Sven Berlin.  Other early members included: Leonard Fuller, Isobel Heath, Alexander Mackenzie, John Wells, Bryan Wynter, Wilhelmina Barns-Graham, David Haughton, Denis Mitchell, and the printer Guido Morris.  Herbert Read was invited to be the first president.

The group bought fishing lofts along Porthmeor beach to use as artists' studios, after an acrimonious split from the established St Ives Society of Artists.  Then on 8 February 1949, after a town meeting at the Castle Inn, a dissident group set up shop in Fore street, St Ives.  In 1960 an old pilchard factory was taken over with converted studios above.  After ten years of sincere guidance and deep interest, funds were raised by Barbara Hepworth, with the aim of converting adjacent buildings into studios for craft and sculpture as well as painting; these expanded the project still further at Back Road, St Ives.  In 1967 Kathleen Watkins was appointed curator and secretary (1967-2013) of the society advising, among other things, clients on potential purchases.

Members
, the current full members were:

References

External links

Penwith Society of Arts from the Newlyn fish industry forum
 Penwith Society of Arts

Cornish culture
Clubs and societies in Cornwall
Arts in St Ives, Cornwall
Arts organisations based in the United Kingdom
Arts organizations established in 1949
1949 establishments in England